Slutever is an American television series broadcast by Viceland, starting in January 2018. The show is inspired by the blog and book of the same name by author Karley Sciortino, and a webseries, called Slutever for Vice, that was hosted on Sciortino's Slutever blog. In April 2018, Viceland ordered a second season of the show, which premiered in February 2019. As of March 31, 2019 two seasons and 18 episodes have aired.

Episodes

Season 1 (2018)

Season 2 (2019)

See also
 List of programs broadcast by Viceland

References

External links
 

2010s American documentary television series
2010s American LGBT-related television series
2018 American television series debuts
English-language television shows
Sexuality in television
Television series based on Internet-based works
Viceland original programming